Adolph Grant Wolf, half a century after his death, continues holding the record as the longest-serving Associate Justice of the Supreme Court of Puerto Rico.  Appointed by President Theodore Roosevelt in 1904, he served for thirty-six years until his resignation on November 15, 1940.

Born in Washington, DC, Wolf obtained a B.A. degree at Johns Hopkins University in 1890.  After a brief academic interlude in Berlin, Germany, he obtained his law degree as well as a Masters in Law degree from George Washington University.  Admitted to the DC Bar, the district's Court of Appeals, the Maryland Court of Appeals as well as the United States Supreme Court, in 1904 he accepts the President's appointment to the recently created Supreme Court of Puerto Rico.

Adolph Grant Wolf died on November 3, 1947, after winning the admiration of Puerto Rico's legal profession for his accomplishments on the bench.

Sources 

La Justicia en sus Manos by Luis Rafael Rivera, 

Associate Justices of the Supreme Court of Puerto Rico
George Washington University Law School alumni
Johns Hopkins University alumni
Puerto Rican lawyers
1947 deaths
Year of birth missing
20th-century Puerto Rican lawyers
Puerto Rican judges